"Celice" is a song by Norwegian band A-ha. Written by Magne Furuholmen and Martin Terefe, it was released as the first single from the album, Analogue, throughout Europe. It was released on 7 October 2005 in Germany and Norway, and 24 October in Sweden. It was not released in the UK. It reached worldwide sales of over 300,000 units. For a while the song was under consideration to be included on the Da Vinci Code movie soundtrack. It was their ninth and recent number-one hit on the Norway charts.

Track listing
 "Celice" (Radio Cut)
 "Celice" (Live at Frognerparken)
 "Celice" (Paul van Dyk's Radio Edit)
 "The Summers of Our Youth"
 "Celice" (music video)

The Remixes
 "Celice" Radio Cut (3:28)
 "Celice" Thomas Schumacher Remix (7:53)
 "Celice" Boris Dlugosch Remix (6:38)
 "Celice" Paul van Dyk's Extended Mix (5:42)
 "Celice" Paul van Dyk's Vocalized Clubmix (8:07).

Music video
The video for the song was directed by Jörn Heitmann, famous for directing the videos of Rammstein, and was filmed in a brothel in Berlin. It was considered controversial by fans and the media due to its strong adult content, featuring topics not as clear in A-ha videos before; sex, drugs, suicide, prostitution, and alcohol had never been so prominently featured in the band's videos, although sadomasochism had been noted in the previous release, "Move to Memphis". Heat sensors are used to show some of the more graphic images from the video.

One Norwegian newspaper held the headline, "Raw sex in A-ha video" after the video was officially released on September 24, 2005.

Magne: "The video is about people who have lost their direction in the hunt for meaning - and loneliness as a result of lost innocence."

Charts

References

2005 singles
A-ha songs
Number-one singles in Norway
Songs written by Magne Furuholmen
Songs written by Martin Terefe
Polydor Records singles
2005 songs